Ancient Egyptian Hieroglyphs: A Practical Guide is one of the modern primers on the Egyptian language and hieroglyphs, from the late 20th to early 21st century.

The text is a color-coded guide to individual Ancient Egyptian objects or writings, and their modern translations. The book is by Janice Kamrin, c. 2004; she received a Ph.D. in Egyptian archaeology from the University of Pennsylvania, has worked with Zahi Hawass, and has taught at the American University in Cairo.

Summary of layout
The text uses pictures and graphics, divided into 46 Lessons-(40 photos, some color-coded, and 37 graphics).

The final two topics, Lessons 45, 46 are The Autobiography of Harkhuf in three parts, and a section of the famous Battle of Kadesh.

The book contains five appendices, including a sign list referring to Gardiner's Sign List, and ascribing each sign's name; not all 700 names of Gardiner's list are standardized, nor is every sign completely understood as to meaning. Also, an 'answer key' to the exercises, and a short dictionary: "Word List (Egyptian to English)".

Objects transliterated
Many of the objects from the book are located in the Egyptian Museum. Some of the notable items transliterated are:

 The Slab stela of Nefer-t-Ab-t(Nefertiabet).
 The Slab stela of Wepemnefert.
 Brief translation from Narmer Palette.
 2-3 paragraphs from the Battle of Kadesh.
 Entrance to the Tomb Chapel of Tomb of two Brothers-(with Ancient Egyptian offering formula).
 A detailed, 4-column false door.
 Naos (shrine) of Ptahmes-(2 columns, 1 horizontal text, and writing on Ptahmes' body in Naos-center).
 "Stela of Tetisheri"
 Old Kingdom, 4th Dynasty dual painted seated statues of "Rahotep, and wife Nefer-t".
 1 of the 7 wood panels of Hesy-Ra, 3rd Dynasty.
 Canopic chest of Tutankhamun.

See also
Hesy-Ra–(Example from one of his wooden panels)

References

Kamrin, Janice, Ancient Egyptian Hieroglyphs: A Practical Guide, c 2004, Harry N. Abrams, Publisher, {hardcover, }

Modern Egyptian hieroglyphs books